Ofir Kriaf (born 17 March 1991) is an Israeli association footballer who plays as a midfielder and as the captain of Beitar Jerusalem.

Early life
Kriaf was born in Jerusalem, to a family of Sephardic Jewish (Tunisian-Jewish) descent.

International career
He scored in Israel's 1–0 win against England U-21 on 11 June 2013, at the 2013 UEFA Euros Under-21 that were held in Israel.

Honours

Club
Maccabi Haifa
Israel State Cup (1): 2015–16
Beitar Jerusalem
Israeli Toto Cup: 2019–20

References

External links
 

1991 births
Living people
Israeli footballers
Jewish footballers
Israel international footballers
Association football midfielders
Beitar Jerusalem F.C. players
Maccabi Haifa F.C. players
Hapoel Ironi Kiryat Shmona F.C. players
Israeli Premier League players
Israeli people of Tunisian-Jewish descent
Israeli people of Kurdish-Jewish descent
Footballers from Jerusalem
Israel under-21 international footballers
Israeli Sephardi Jews
Israeli Mizrahi Jews